The 2009 season was the Brisbane Roar's second season of football (soccer) in Australia's women's league, the W-League.

Season 2 – 2009

Fixtures
The season was played over 10 rounds, followed by a finals series.

Standings

Players
Squad retrieved from recent articles.

Player Movement

In
 Jo Burgess (Sydney FC)
 Pam Bignold (The Gap SC)
 Aivi Luik (FC Indiana)
 Leah Curtis (The Gap SC)
 Emily Gielnik (Redlands United)

Out
 Tashina Roma
 Vedrana Popovic
 Veronica Williams
 Ruth Blackburn
 Kim Carroll
 Alicia Ferguson

Squad statistics
Last updated 10 October 2009

References

2009
Brisbane Roar